Glycylpeptide N-tetradecanoyltransferase 2 known also as N-myristoyltransferase, is an enzyme  (EC: 2.3.1.97) that in humans is encoded by the NMT2 gene.

Function 

N-myristoyltransferase (NMT) catalyzes the reaction of N-terminal myristoylation of many signaling proteins. It transfers myristic acid from myristoyl coenzyme A to the amino group of a protein's N-terminal glycine residue. Biochemical evidence indicates the presence of several distinct NMTs, varying in apparent molecular weight and /or subcellular distribution. The 496-amino acid of human NMT2 protein shares 77% and 96%  sequence identity with human NMT1 and mouse Nmt2 comprise two distinct families of N-myristoyltransferases.

Interactions
NMT2 has been shown to interact with:
 caspase 3
 MARCKS

See also
 N-myristoyltransferase 1

References

Further reading

External links 
 PDBe-KB provides an overview of all the structure information available in the PDB for Human Glycylpeptide N-tetradecanoyltransferase 2 (NMT2)